The Second International (1889–1916) was an organisation of socialist and labour parties, formed on 14 July 1889 at two simultaneous Paris meetings in which delegations from twenty countries participated. The Second International continued the work of the dissolved First International, though excluding the powerful anarcho-syndicalist movement. While the international had initially declared its opposition to all warfare between European powers, most of the major European parties ultimately chose to support their respective states in World War I. After splitting into pro-Allied, pro-Central Powers, and antimilitarist factions, the international ceased to function. After the war, the remaining factions of the international went on to found the Labour and Socialist International, the International Working Union of Socialist Parties, and the Communist International.

History

Pre-foundation conferences (1881–1889) 

The foundation of a new international was first discussed at a conference at Chur in October 1881. Delegates included members of the Social Democratic Party of Germany (SPD), Belgian socialists, the Federation of the Socialist Workers of France (SFIO), French and German-speaking Swiss delegations, two Polish delegates, and one delegate each for Russia and Hungary. The conference did not form an international that year, but decided to write a new socialist manifesto to be approved at a subsequent meeting. According to Yuri Steklov, the conference was exceedingly poorly organized, and thus didn't engender confidence that a new international could be founded.

Efforts to found a new international were greatly complicated by a factional divide within the Federation of the Socialist Workers of France between the Marxists and Possibilists. From its founding in 1879, a faction inspired (though not always endorsed) by Paul Brousse had moved away from revolutionary socialism towards a more reformist approach, arguing that socialists should pursue whichever reforms are "possible" at any given time, while still taking advantage of revolutionary opportunities.  A Marxist faction led by Jules Guesde and Paul Lafargue, and supported by Karl Marx and Friedrich Engels, denounced the possibilist faction as opportunists, founding the rival French Workers' Party in 1882. Confusingly, both parties would call themselves the Parti Ouvrier (worker's party), and so were generally known as the Marxist party and possibilist party.

The possibilist party would convene international socialist conferences several times, in 1883, 1884, and 1886. At the 1886 convention, it was decided that another convention would be held in 1889, but the Social Democratic Party of Germany disagreed with the decision, and the decisions at the 1886 convention were generally seen to have lacked legitimacy. The SPD held its own convention in St. Gallen in 1887, whereupon the SFIO decided to hold their own international conference the following year. When the London International Trades Union Congress declared that a new international meeting would be called in Paris in 1889, both the SPD and Possibilists decided to fold their next congress into the new one, creating one large international meeting. However, the SPD had only joined the new meeting on the condition that the hosts would not ask for records and names from the delegates, since the SPD could have faced immediate dissolution and ejection from the Reichstag if the German government discovered it had sent delegates abroad. When the Trade Union Congress responded that delegates would only be considered legitimate if they could prove their mandate with appropriate records, the SPD and their Marxist supporters decided to hold a separate congress near the Possibilist congress, with the hope of uniting the two at a later date. The separation into two congresses in 1889 effectively forced foreign delegations to divide themselves up between supporters of the Possibilists, and supporters of the SPD.

Foundation and pre-war period (1889–1914) 

When the first meetings of the new international were held in Paris on July 14, 1889, the two factions were still discussing the possibility of unity. The two meetings had effectively divided the entire European socialist movement into two camps: the Possibilists, supported by the British Social Democratic Federation, and the Marxists, supported by the SPD, the British Socialist League, and most of the other European delegates. The Possibilists insisted upon recording the names and documentation of delegates so as to verify their mandate, while the Marxists (many of whom faced conditions of illegality at home) were concerned about information being discovered by the authorities. However, according to John Burns, William Morris, and some of the Marxist delegates, there were no real concerns around verification until Henry Hyndman proposed the measure, and the dispute was a deliberate ploy to split the congress in two, an allegation strongly rebuked by Annie Besant. Regardless of which account is true, the split between the Possibilists and Marxists threatened to create two separate internationals, with subsequent conferences in Brussels and Zürich respectively. However, after the anger aroused during the split congresses had died down, the Marxists ultimately agreed to join the Brussels conference and create a single, unified international.

While the factional divide between the possibilists and Marxists abated to a degree, the international continued to be plagued by major factional disputes at each congress. By the time of the 1896 congress in London, considered "the most agitated, the most tumultuous, and the most chaotic of all the congresses of the Second International", a more concrete rift had developed between reformist and revolutionary approaches to socialist power, which resulted in many factions along national lines.

Among the Second International's famous actions were its 1889 declaration of 1 May (May Day) as International Workers' Day and its 1910 declaration of the International Women's Day, first celebrated on 19 March and then on 8 March after the main day of the women's marches in 1917 during the Russian Revolution. It initiated the international campaign for the eight-hour working day.

The International's permanent executive and information body was the International Socialist Bureau (ISB) based in Brussels and formed after the International's Paris Congress of 1900. Emile Vandervelde and Camille Huysmans of the Belgian Labour Party were its chair and secretary. Vladimir Lenin was a member from 1905.

The pre-war period is notable for the repeated statements against militarism jointly issued by members of the international, which were largely ignored in 1914. At the founding of the international, Paul Lafargue affirmed that socialists were "brothers with a single common enemy [...] private capital, whether it be Prussian, French, or Chinese." The 1907 conference at Stuttgart resulted in a joint resolution which stated that "struggle against militarism cannot be separated from the Socialist class struggle in general." The extraordinary congress in Basel in 1912 was largely devoted to a discussion of rising militarism, which resulted in a manifesto stating that the working classes should "exert every effort in order to prevent the outbreak of war by the means they consider most effective." Finally on July 29, 1914, the ISB held an emergency meeting wherein it “resolved unanimously that it shall be the duty of the workers of all nations concerned not only to continue but to further intensify their demonstrations against the war, for peace, and for the settlement of the Austro-Serbian conflict by international arbitration.”

First world war and dissolution (1914–1916) 

The antimilitarist French Section of the Workers' International (SFIO) leader Jean Jaurès's assassination a few days before the beginning of the First World War generated an outpouring of antimilitarist sentiment from many members of the socialist international. Nonetheless, immediately after the outbreak of war, all of the major socialist parties in belligerent nations (with the notable exception of the Independent Labour Party) had issued statements in full support of war. This took many socialist parties in neutral countries by surprise, such as the Romanian Social Democrats, who initially refused to print the SPD's endorsement of war, believing it to be a forgery.

The war effectively split the international into three factions: the pro-war social democratic parties in the Central Powers, the pro-war parties of the Triple Entente, and the various anti-war parties, including the parties in neutral countries and many pacifist or revolutionary socialist parties. The leadership of the international, especially Secretary General of the ISB Camille Huysmans, attempted to coordinate meetings between the various parties, including one-on-one meetings between pro-war leaders from opposing sides, but by July 1916 the ISB's attempts had failed.

Despite the failure to bring the various parties together into a single congress, each faction would hold its own conferences during the war. The German, Austrian, and Hungarian pro-war parties successfully met at the Vienna Socialist Conference of 1915. The pro-war parties in the allied powers successfully met four times at the Inter-Allied Socialist Conferences of World War I. Anti-war parties first met as representatives from the neutral countries at the Neutral Socialist Conferences during the First World War, then as part of the Zimmerwald movement which successfully convinced the neutral, pacifist and revolutionary parties to split from the international. The Zimmerwald movement would lead to a much greater schism between the reformist and revolutionary wings of the international, which would eventually result in the Third International.

Attempted re-establishment and successor organizations (1918–1923) 

In July 1920 at Geneva, the last congress of the Second International was held, following its functional collapse during the war. However, some European socialist parties refused to join the reorganised International and decided instead to form the International Working Union of Socialist Parties (IWUSP) (Second and a half International or Two-and-a-half International), heavily influenced by Austromarxism. In 1923, IWUSP and the Second International merged to form the social democratic Labour and Socialist International which continued to exist until 1940. After World War II, a new Socialist International was formed to continue the policies of the Labour and Socialist International, which continues to this day.

Another successor was the Third International organised in 1919 by revolutionary socialists after the October Revolution and the creation of the Soviet Union. It was officially called the Communist International (Comintern) and lasted until 1943 when it was dissolved by then Soviet leader Joseph Stalin.

Analysis

Relationship to anarchism 
The Second International had a complex and changeable relationship to anarchist groups and individuals. The conflict between anarchist and Marxist factions dated back to the days of the First International, which was frequently characterized by clashes between the state socialists (ie. the Lassallists, Marxists and Blanquists) on one hand, and the anarchists (ie. the mutualists and collectivists) on the other. Tensions reached their peak after the Hague Congress of 1872, wherein an attempt was made to expel Mikhail Bakunin and James Guillaume and move the general council to New York City, effectively disbanding the organization. Competing anarchist and state socialist internationals attempted to continue on alone, but both ultimately ended in failure within five years.

As a result of the 1872 split, anarchist and social democratic factions were reluctant to work with one another. The anarchist organizations ultimately refused to participate in the Chur congress of 1881, instead opting to hold a separate congress in London which would result in the International Working People's Association or "black" international. As a result, anarchist organizations were not involved in discussions to found the second international in 1889. Nonetheless, several anarchist individuals would hold positions in the international, and anarchists were actually the dominant faction within several of the ostensibly Marxist organizations, such as the Social Democratic League. Despite holding positions as delegates, and ostensibly being welcome during the first two congresses, expressions of anarchist ideas were often shouted down, and in one incident Francesco Saverio Merlino faced violence from the other delegates, but was shielded by delegates from the British Socialist League.

Anarchist individuals and factions would ultimately be officially excluded at the 1893 Zurich congress, prompting many social democratic parties to expel their anarchist factions. An attempt to repeal the decision was made at the subsequent London congress of 1896, which was attended by anarchist figures like Errico Malatesta and Christiaan Cornelissen, supported by some Marxist figures including Keir Hardie, Tom Mann, and a very sickly William Morris. Discussion of anarchism would dominate the congress, but the anarchists were not successful in reversing their expulsion.

Bolshevik critique 

Bolshevik figures like Vladimir Lenin and Nikolai Bukharin gained international notability during the war years for their criticisms of the international's inability to coordinate an anti-war opposition. Lenin and Bukharin based their critique in a theory of imperialism, associating the reformism and social imperialism of the various pro-war parties with the rise of monopoly capital and imperialist superprofits. The Bolsheviks believed that monopoly capitalists had created large national blocs of capital which sought to divide the world among themselves, a process which created superprofits either through tariffs, or as a side-effect of capital export. Superprofits extracted from colonized areas were diverted to the advanced countries, whereupon a portion was given over to a labor aristocracy as a "bribe", in the form of higher wages. The Bolsheviks saw this privileged, highly-skilled strata of workers organized into craft unions as a threat within the labor movement, which would try to take leadership positions in order to gain higher wages at the expense of other proletarians. Lenin and Bukharin believed that the leadership of the international, especially in the pro-war parties, were largely labor aristocrats or else were influenced by a labor aristocratic ideology.

While the labor aristocracy thesis informed the Bolsheviks' general critique of the international, Lenin also had more specific criticisms of the leaders of the international who had sided with the pro-war parties. Lenin believed that there were really two pro-war ideologies in the international, the "who started it?" theorists represented by Georgi Plekhanov, and the more nuanced "saccharo-conciliatory chauvinis[ts]" represented by Karl Kautsky. Plekhanov generally agreed with the Entente, believing that German warmongering was a criminal act that needed to be punished by an international coalition. Kautsky suggested that the principle of national self-determination gave each national proletariat the right to defend itself, including violence against other proletarians. Lenin believed that both positions represented different attempts to rationalize labor aristocratic ideology.

Anti-colonial critique 
Despite issuing a statement against colonialism at the 1896 London congress, the international was criticized by anti-colonial figures for providing insufficient opposition to colonial expansion. While the pre-war international was relatively consistent in its opposition to an inter-imperialist conflict between European powers, it was often paternalistic towards colonial areas, and statements often mentioned a need to educate or civilize conquered peoples. By the Stuttgart congress of 1907, parties in the international had substantially shifted away from their earlier consensus on ostensible anticolonialism towards a mix of overtly pro-colonial, anti-colonial and neutral views. These divisions were made apparent in a proposal by the Dutch delegate Henri van Kol that the international drop its anticolonial position, which was defeated 128 votes to 108.  Part of this was due to a concerted effort by non-socialist parties and the media to question the patriotism of anti-colonial parties, for example the SPD and Catholic Centre Party of Germany initially opposed the Herero and Namaqua genocide before giving in to extreme political pressure. The Dutch Social Democratic Workers' Party was particularly insistent on the legitimacy of a "socialist colonialism", and opposed most anti-colonial resolutions on the basis that colonialism under a socialist government could be benevolent and mutually beneficial. The French SFIO likewise supported a policy of "national colonialism", while the right wing of the SPD supported "national imperialism", and the British Labour Party's stated policy was "ethical imperialism". The pro-colonial reputation of the second international would later drive Ho Chi Minh to join the third international.

Antisemitism 

From its outset, one of the objectives of the international was to build a consensus on the "Jewish question", a contemporary term for debates on the civil, legal, national, and political status and treatment of Jews as a minority group. The founders of the international in 1889 included some noted antisemites including Henry Hyndman, who led the English attendees at the Possibilist congress, but also a great many Jewish-led organizations and Jewish delegates.

Despite these differences, at the 1891 congress in Brussels the delegates managed to pass a unanimous resolution against antisemitism; however, at the insistence of the Blanquist delegates Dr. A. Regnard and M. Argyriades, the congress would pass an amended resolution targeting "philo-semitic tyranny", noting that many Jewish bankers were "great oppressors of labour". Regnard stated that he believed many Jews owned the newspapers, while Argyriades stated his belief that Jews owned the banks and many industries. The Times reported that the pair's amendment was greeted with applause and was passed with only minor opposition. This has been noted as a major instance of antisemitism within the international, as although all of the delegates were ostensibly opposed to antisemitism, the resolution indicates that many delegates believed in the antisemitic canard that Jews controlled the banking system, or that financial capital was somehow intrinsically tied to Jews. In addition to antisemitism against Jewish bankers and capitalists, the British socialist newspaper Justice reported that "[t]here appears to be a strong feeling against the Jews in the Congress."

The "Jewish question" was not revisited after the 1891 congress; however, after the establishment of the ISB there appears to have been some attempt to rectify the imbalance against Jewish organizations within the international by granting them additional consultative votes on relevant issues. Such votes were granted to the Jewish Socialist Workers Party and Zionist Socialist Workers Party at the 1907 congress.

Affiliated organizations

Sub-organizations 

 International Socialist Bureau (1900–1916): The BSI was the only permanent organizing committee of the international, founded to provide a degree of continuity between conferences. It met yearly alongside the regular conferences to coordinate decision-making between the member parties. After 1914 the BSI failed to meet aside from sporadic attempts at one-on-one meetings between delegates, contributing to the dissolution of the international.
 International Federation of Socialist Young People's Organizations (1907–1916): Socialist youth groups were common among member parties of the international from its foundation, and the need to create youth organizations was encouraged at the 1900 and 1904 conferences. At the 1907 Stuttgart conference a youth federation was officially formed, with a headquarters in Vienna. This organization actually outlasted the international as the International Union of Socialist Youth.
 Women's International Council of Socialist and Labour Organizations (1907–1916): The women's international was formed out of the International Socialist Women's Conferences held in conjunction with the regular congresses of 1907, 1910, and 1915. Clara Zetkin was elected as secretary of the organization, with Die Gleichheit chosen as the official newspaper. The women's grouping outlasted the international as Socialist International Women.

Member parties and unions

Congresses and Conferences of the Second International

Prewar congresses 
Source: Julius Braunthal (1980). History of the International: Volume 3, 1943–1968. London. Victor Gollancz. p. 562.

Postwar conferences 
After World War I, there were three Socialist Conferences in Switzerland. These served as a bridge to the creation of the Labour and Socialist International.

Related international gatherings 
Source: Julius Braunthal (1980). History of the International: Volume 3, 1943-1968. London. Victor Gollancz. pp. 562–563.

See also 
 Communist International (Third International or Comintern)
 Fourth International and Trotskyist internationals
 Fifth International
 International Anarchist Congresses
 International Working People's Association ("Black" International)
 International Workingmen's Association (First International)
 Labour and Socialist International
 International Working Union of Socialist Parties (Second and a half international or Vienna International)
 Socialist International

Footnotes

External links 
 "The Second International". Marxists.org.
 Igor Mikhailovich Krivoguz. "The Second International 1889-1914: The History and Heritage". Progress Publishers, Moscow, 1989.
 "History of the Second International" (in French and English).
 "German social-democratic party and the Second International". Fractal-vortex.
 

 
1889 establishments in France
Political internationals
History of socialism
History of social movements
Political parties established in 1889
Organizations disestablished in 1916
International Socialist Organisations